Ajo High School is a high school in Ajo, Arizona. It is the only high school in the Ajo Unified School District, which also includes an elementary school and middle school on the same campus.  It is a member of the CAA.

References

Public high schools in Arizona
Schools in Pima County, Arizona